Palabra de honor (Word of Honor) is a 1939  Argentine comedy film directed by Luis Cesar Amadori. The film premiered on May 10, 1939 in Buenos Aires and starred Luis Sandrini.

Cast
 Luis Sandrini ... Pitango			
 Alicia Vignoli ... Laura Conde		
 María Esther Buschiazzo ...  Pitango's mother		
 Roberto Airaldi ... Raúl Lucera 		
 José Casamayor		
 Cirilo Etulain		
 José Antonio Paonessa ... "Chancho Negro" Patiño		
 José Ruzzo ... Ronco
   Alfredo Fornaresio ... Sambayón

References

External links

1939 films
1930s Spanish-language films
Argentine black-and-white films
1939 comedy films
Films directed by Luis César Amadori
Argentine comedy films
1930s Argentine films